This is a list of municipal elections held in Guelph, Ontario, Canada.

 1991 Guelph municipal election
 1994 Guelph municipal election
 1997 Guelph municipal election
 2000 Guelph municipal election
 2003 Guelph municipal election
 2006 Guelph municipal election
 2010 Guelph municipal election
 2014 Guelph municipal election
 2018 Guelph municipal election

References